The 2004 Sudanese coup attempt was a coup d'état attempt in Sudan in March 2004 against the president Omar al-Bashir and his cabinet, inspired by opposition leaders and Hassan Al-Turabi. It ended with the arrests of army officers over the next few days. A second attempted coup was staged in September 2004.

See also
 2012 Sudanese coup d'état attempt

References

Military coups in Sudan
Coup d'etat attempt
Sudanese coup d'etat attempt
2000s coups d'état and coup attempts
March 2004 events in Africa
September 2004 events in Africa
Attempted coups d'état in Sudan